Events from the year 1501 in art.

Events

Works

 Giovanni Bellini – Portrait of Doge Leonardo Loredan
 Giorgione – The Three Ages of Man
 Leonardo da Vinci – Madonna of the Yarnwinder
 Raphael – Baronci altarpiece

Births
date unknown
Girolamo da Carpi, court painter and decorator to the Duke d'Este (died 1556)
Perino del Vaga, Italian painter  (died 1547)
Wang Guxiang, Chinese landscape painter during the Ming Dynasty (died 1568)
Wen Jia, Chinese painter of landscapes and flowers during the Ming Dynasty (died 1583)

Deaths
 Gil de Siloé, Spanish Gothic sculptor of Flemish origin (born 1440)
 Bartolomeo di Giovanni, Early renaissance Italian painter of the Florentine School (b. unknown)
 Ali-Shir Nava'i, Central Asian politician, mystic, linguist, painter, and poet (born 1441)
 1501/1502: Vittorio Crivelli, Italian painter (born 1440)

 
Years of the 16th century in art
1500s in art